The East Oriental Covered Bridge, also known as the Sheaffer Covered Bridge, is a historic wooden covered bridge located at Perry Township near Meiserville in Snyder County, Pennsylvania and Susquehanna Township near Oriental in Juniata County, Pennsylvania. It is a  Burr Truss bridge.  It crosses Mahantango Creek, but is no longer in vehicle use.

It was listed on the National Register of Historic Places in 1979.

See also 
 National Register of Historic Places listings in Snyder County, Pennsylvania

References 

Covered bridges on the National Register of Historic Places in Pennsylvania
Covered bridges in Snyder County, Pennsylvania
Wooden bridges in Pennsylvania
Bridges in Juniata County, Pennsylvania
Tourist attractions in Juniata County, Pennsylvania
Bridges in Snyder County, Pennsylvania
Tourist attractions in Snyder County, Pennsylvania
National Register of Historic Places in Snyder County, Pennsylvania
National Register of Historic Places in Juniata County, Pennsylvania
Road bridges on the National Register of Historic Places in Pennsylvania
Burr Truss bridges in the United States